Robert Johanny was a sailor from Austria, who represented his country at the 1928 Summer Olympics in Amsterdam, Netherlands.

References

Sources 
 

Sailors at the 1928 Summer Olympics – 12' Dinghy
Olympic sailors of Austria
Austrian male sailors (sport)
Year of birth missing
Year of death missing